Saudades do Samba is the debut album by Brazilian singer Aline Wirley, released in 2009. The work, inspired by Elis Regina and Chico Buarque and released by independent record label, focused on the roots of samba and MPB, leaving aside the old pop music that he performed. The album did not even have any song released for the radio, although "Sufoco" was featured on the soundtrack of the novel Mutantes: Promesas de Amor.

Track listing

References

2009 debut albums
Aline Wirley albums
Portuguese-language albums